The Mayor of Hetauda is the head of the municipal executive of Hetauda. The role was created in 1969.

The mayor as of 2022 is Mina Kumari Lama. The position has been held by five people.

The city is governed by the Hetauda Sub-Metropolitan City Council and the mayor is supported by the municipal executive which consists of the deputy mayor and ward chairs of Hetauda's 19 wards.

Responsibilities 
The mayor is elected for a five-year term that is renewable only once. The municipal executive is formed under the chairmanship of the mayor. The local government in Nepal has authority over the local units pursuant to Schedule 8 of the Constitution of Nepal. The mayor derives its power from the Local Government Operation Act, 2017.

The mayor's powers are:
 Summon and chair meetings of the municipal assembly and the municipal executive
 Table agendas and proposals to the assembly and executive
 Prepare and present the annual programmes and budget
 Enforce the decisions of the assembly and executive
 Oversee the work of committees and sub-committees of the municipality and ward committees.

The mayor of Hetauda s also a member of the Makwanpur District Assembly.

Election 
The mayor is elected though first-past-the-post voting. In order to qualify as a candidate for mayor, the person must be a citizen of Nepal, must be over twenty-one, must be registered in the electoral roll of Hetauda Sub-Metropolitan City and not be disqualified by law.

List of mayors

Panchayat era (1960–1990)

Constitutional monarchy (1990-2008)

Federal Democratic Republic of Nepal (2017-present)

See also 
Mayor of Kathmandu 
Mayor of Pokhara 
Mayor of Dharan

Reference 

People from Hetauda
Lists of mayors
Lists of political office-holders in Nepal